Deborah Anne Pullen (née Kok) (12 June 1963 – 8 May 2010) was an association football player who represented New Zealand at international level.

She made her Football Ferns debut in a 2–2 draw with Australia on 6 October 1979. She represented New Zealand at the Women's World Cup finals in China in 1991 playing all 3 group games; a 0–3 loss to Denmark, a 0–4 loss to Norway and a 1–4 loss to China.  In her international career, she won 40 caps scored 6 goals.

She died of lung cancer on 8 May 2010.

References

External links

1963 births
2010 deaths
New Zealand women's international footballers
New Zealand women's association footballers
1991 FIFA Women's World Cup players
Deaths from lung cancer
Women's association football midfielders